A crystal ball, also known as an orbuculum or crystal sphere, is a crystal or glass ball and common fortune-telling object. It is generally associated with the performance of clairvoyance and scrying in particular.

In more recent times, the crystal ball has been used for creative photography with the term lensball commonly used to describe a crystal ball used as a photography prop.

History
In the first century CE, Pliny the Elder describes use of crystal balls by soothsayers ("crystallum orbis", later written in Medieval Latin by scribes as orbuculum).  By the fifth century CE, scrying was widespread within the Roman Empire and was condemned by the early medieval Christian Church as heretical.

Dr. John Dee was a noted British mathematician, astronomer, astrologer, geographer, and consultant to Queen Elizabeth I. He devoted much of his life to alchemy, divination, and Hermetic philosophy, of which the use of crystal balls was often included.

Crystal gazing was a popular pastime in the Victorian era, and was claimed to work best when the Sun is at its northernmost declination. Immediately before the appearance of a vision, the ball was said to mist up from within.

Romani fortune tellers used crystal balls to predict the fortune of their customers.

Art of scrying

The art or process of "seeing" is known as "scrying", whereby images are claimed to be seen in crystals, or other media such as water, and are interpreted as meaningful information. The "information" gleaned then is used to make important decisions in one's life (i.e. love, marriage, finances, travel, business, etc.).

When the technique of scrying is used with crystals, or any transparent body, it is known as crystallomancy or crystal gazing.

In stage magic
Crystal balls are popular props used in mentalism acts by stage magicians. Such routines, in which the performer answers audience questions by means of various ruses, are known as crystal gazing acts. One of the most famous performers of the 20th century, Claude Alexander, was often billed as "Alexander the Crystal Seer".

Properties
A crystal ball is essentially a bi-convex spherical lens with a uniform radius of curvature, although without its edges and center material truncated as in a conventional lens construction.  Thus the principles of optics may be applied to analyze its imaging characteristics.

As a lens, a transparent sphere of any material with refractive index greater than one bends rays of light to a focal point.  An image is formed with significant coma, field curvature, and other optical aberrations inherent to spherical lenses. The refractive index of typical materials used for crystal balls (quartz: 1.46, window glass: 1.52), produces a central focal point just outside the surface of the sphere, on the side diametrically opposite to where the rays entered.

For materials with refractive index greater than 2, the focus will be located inside the sphere. In this case the image is not directly accessible, while the closest accessible point is on its surface directly opposite the source of light. However, few materials have a refractive index this high. For a refractive index of 2, the image forms on the surface of the sphere, and the image may be viewed on an translucent object or diffusing coating on the imaging side of the sphere.

Since a crystal ball has no edges like a conventional lens, the image-forming properties are omnidirectional (independent of the direction being imaged). This effect is exploited in the Campbell–Stokes recorder, a scientific instrument which records the brightness of sunlight by burning the surface of a paper card bent around the sphere.  The device, itself fixed, records the apparent motion and intensity of the sun across the sky, burning an image of the sun's motion across the card.

The omnidirectional burning glass effect can occur with a crystal ball that is brought into full sunlight.  The image of the sun formed by a large crystal ball will burn a hand that is holding it, and can ignite dark-coloured flammable material placed near it.

Famous crystal balls in history
A crystal ball lies in the Sceptre of Scotland that is said to have been originally possessed by pagan druids.

Philadelphia's University of Pennsylvania Museum of Archaeology and Anthropology (also called Penn Museum for short) displays the third largest crystal ball as the central object in its Chinese Rotunda. Weighing , the sphere is made of quartz crystal from Burma and was shaped through years of constant rotation in a semi-cylindrical container filled with emery, garnet powder, and water. The ornamental treasure was purportedly made for the Empress Dowager Cixi (1835-1908) during the Qing dynasty in the 19th century, but no evidence as to its actual origins exists.

In 1988, the crystal ball and an ancient Egyptian statuette which depicted the god Osiris were stolen from the Penn Museum but were recovered three years later with no damage done to either object.

A crystal ball was among the grave-goods of the Merovingian King, Childeric I, who lived c. 437 - 481 AD.   The grave-goods were discovered in 1653.  In 1831, they were stolen from the royal library in France where they were being kept.  Few items were ever recovered.  The crystal ball was not among them.

See also
Campbell–Stokes recorder
Crystal skull
Gazing ball
Palantír
Salvator Mundi (Leonardo),  da Vinci's "Savior of the World" painting depicting Christ holding a crystal ball
Seer stone (Latter Day Saints)

Notes

References

Further reading
 Andrew Lang, Crystal visions, savage and civilised, The Making of Religion, Chapter V, Longmans, Green, and C°, London, New York and Bombay, 1900, pp. 83–104.
Geoffrey Munn, The Sphere of Magical Thinking: The Enchanting History of Crystal Balls. 2018

External links

 
 

Objects used for divination
Balls
Lenses
Romani culture